The International Association for Measurement and Evaluation of Communication (also known as AMEC) is a UK-based global trade association for companies who provide social media measurement and traditional media measurement, evaluation and communication research.

History 
AMEC was founded in London in 1996 with seven members. Since then, it has grown into a global trade association that aims to define and develop the media evaluation measurement industry worldwide.

AMEC has pledged to find an alternative to the current industry standard for measuring communications success, Advertising Value Equivalent. In 2010 it issued the Barcelona Declaration of Research Principles, a set of seven voluntary guidelines established by the public relations (PR) industry to measure the efficacy of PR campaigns.

In February 2012, according to the Institute for Public Relations (IPR), AMEC is part of a new coalition to drive standards for PR research and measurement, along with the Council of Public Relations Firms (CPRF), the Public Relations Society of America (PRSA) and other partners.

Functions 
AMEC provides a forum for information, knowledge sharing and best practices in all matters related to research and evaluation of media coverage and related communication issues.

The association has developed the AMEC Quality Assurance Code to help standardise the media evaluation industry.

AMEC hosts an annual awards ceremony to celebrate and recognise the role that media measurement and evaluation has within the PR industry.

Structure
It is based on York Street, between Gloucester Place and Baker Street (both part of the A41), in Marylebone in the north-west of central London.

Members 
AMEC currently has members in Argentina, Australia, Belgium, Bosnia-Herzegovina, Brazil, Bulgaria, Canada, China, Croatia, France, Germany, Hungary, Iceland, Ireland, Italy, Japan, Macedonia, Malaysia, Norway, Portugal, Romania, Russia, Scandinavia, Serbia, Slovakia, Slovenia, Spain, Sweden, Switzerland, The Netherlands, Turkey, United Arab Emirates, the UK and the US.

Prominent member companies include: Cision, Durrants, Gorkana, Echo Research, Kantar Media, Media Measurement, ISentia, Metrica and Precise.

References

External links 
 AMEC homepage

Trade associations based in the United Kingdom
Organizations established in 1996
Organisations based in the City of Westminster
Market research companies of the United Kingdom
Public opinion research companies